William Lynch may refer to:

Politicians and lawyers
 William Lynch (diplomat) (c. 1730–1785), British Member of Parliament for Canterbury and Minister to Sardinia
 William Lynch (Toronto politician)
 William H. Lynch, Mississippi legislator
 William B. Lynch (born 1943), Adjutant General of Pennsylvania
 William Lynch Jr. (1941–2013), Deputy Mayor of New York City under David Dinkins and political consultant
 William Warren Lynch (1845–1916), Canadian lawyer, politician, and judge in the province of Quebec
 William A. Lynch (1844–1907), Ohio lawyer and politician
 William Lynch (Lynch law) (1742–1820), claimed to be the basic cause of the "lynch law" term
 William Joseph Lynch (1908–1976), U.S. federal judge

Sportsmen
 Bill Lynch (born 1954), football coach
 Billy Lynch (Australian footballer) (1909–1985), played for North Melbourne and Essendon
 Billy Lynch (rugby league), rugby league footballer of the 1900s, and 1910s for England, Yorkshire, and Wakefield Trinity
 Bill Lynch (footballer) (1892–1947), Australian rules footballer

Others
 William F. Lynch (1801–1865), captain in the Virginia Navy, who commanded southern forces during the Union attack on Fort Fisher, North Carolina
 Willie Lynch, probably fictional author of the dubious William Lynch speech